Crataegus tracyi is a species of hawthorn from Texas and Mexico. It is a shrub to about 6 m in height with white flowers, round red somewhat hairy fruit, and often with red autumn leaves. It is quite variable in appearance. It is rarely cultivated but has the potential to become a valuable ornamental plant.

References

tracyi
Flora of North America